Caloncoba lophocarpa, synonym Oncoba lophocarpa, is a species of plant in the  	Achariaceae family. It is endemic to Cameroon. Its natural habitats are subtropical or tropical moist lowland forests and subtropical or tropical moist montane forests. It is threatened by habitat loss caused by forest clearance for wood and agriculture.

References

Flora of Cameroon
Achariaceae
Vulnerable plants
Taxonomy articles created by Polbot